Helen Gibb (9 July 1838–30 July 1914) was a New Zealand farmer, accommodation-house keeper and postmistress. She was born in Cortachy and Clova, Forfarshire, Scotland on 9 July 1838.

References

1838 births
1914 deaths
New Zealand farmers
New Zealand women farmers
Scottish emigrants to New Zealand
19th-century New Zealand people